Ostap is a  Ukrainian male given name. Its Russian counterpart is Evstafiy. It derives from the Greek name Eustathius.

People with this name include:

Ostap Bender, a fictional character from the Russian novel The Twelve Chairs.
Ostap Dashkevych (ca. 1495 - 1535), a commander of the Ukrainian Cossacks.
Ostap Ortwin, Polish journalist
Ostap Steckiw, a Canadian soccer player from Lviv
Ostap Veresai (1803-1890), a Ukrainian minstrel. 
Ostap Vyshnia (real name Pavlo Hubenko, 1889–1956), a Ukrainian writer, satirist, and medical official (feldsher).

Ukrainian masculine given names